Lokys is a Lithuanian word for bear, and may also refer to:

 Lokys River, Lithuania
 Lokys (village), Lithuania
 Lokys, a 2000 opera by Bronius Kutavičius
 H23 Lokys, a Lithuanian Naval Force cutter

See also 

 Lokis (disambiguation)